Ichneutica morosa is a moth of the family Noctuidae. It is endemic to New Zealand and is found in the southern parts of the North Island and throughout the South Island. I. morosa is common in the eastern parts of both those islands and also in Fiordland. I. morosa can be found from altitudes ranging from lowlands to the alpine zone. I. morosa is absent from the range of its closely related species I. mustulenta, that is from the northern North Island. The larvae of I. morosa are known to feed on Poa astonii and also on other Poa species including introduced species. As well as its standard form the adult moths have a grey colour morph with the head and thorax being a grey and mottled brown, and the forewing being a pale greyish ochreous to a deep brown, suffused with grey. I. morosa can be confused with I. mustulenta and I. lignana. Adults are on the wing from November to April.

Taxonomy 
This species was described by Arthur Butler in 1880. The male holotype was collected in Marlborough by Mr Skellon and is held at the Natural History Museum, London. In 1988 J. S. Dugdale placed this species within the Graphania genus. In 2019 Robert Hoare undertook a major review of New Zealand Noctuidae. During this review the genus Ichneutica was greatly expanded and the genus Graphania was subsumed into that genus as a synonym. As a result of this review, this species is now known as Ichneutica morosa.

Description 
 
 
Butler described the adults of the species as follows:
The male adult of this species has a wingspan of between 32 and 40 mm and the female has a wingspan of between 34 and 38 mm. This species also has a grey colour morph with the head and thorax being a grey and mottled brown, and the forewing being a pale greyish ochreous to a deep brown, suffused with grey. I. morosa can be confused with I. mustulenta and I. lignana.

Distribution 
It is endemic to New Zealand. This species is found in the southern parts of the North Island and throughout the South Island.

Habitat 
I. morosa is common in the eastern drier parts of both the South and North Island and at  a range of altitudes lowlands to the alpine zone above 900 m.  It also occurs in Fiordland where the rainfall is higher. I. morosa is absent from the range of its closely related species I. mustulenta, that is from the northern North Island.

Behaviour 
The adults of this species is on the wing from November to April.

Life history and host species 

The life history of this species is poorly documented as are the host species of its larvae. As at 2019 the larvae is undescribed but are known to feed on Poa astonii and also on other Poa species including introduced species. The adults are known to feed on blossoms at night and Hudson witnessed adults of this species feeding on white rata flowers.

References

Moths described in 1880
Hadeninae
Moths of New Zealand
Endemic fauna of New Zealand
Taxa named by Arthur Gardiner Butler
Endemic moths of New Zealand